Ecaterina Both Arena is an indoor arena in the north-western Romanian city of Satu Mare. It was built in 1983.

In 2013, the arena changed its name to "Ecaterina Both", after the Satu Mare and national team basketball player Ecaterina Both.

It is the home for the matches of the CSM Satu Mare sports club that includes volleyball, basketball and handball.

References

Indoor arenas in Romania